Dolichostyrax is a genus of longhorn beetles of the subfamily Lamiinae, containing the following species:

 Dolichostyrax longipes Aurivillius, 1913
 Dolichostyrax moultoni Aurivillius, 1911
 Dolichostyrax tuberculatus Fisher, 1936

References

Morimopsini